Big Lake is an unincorporated community and census-designated place (CDP) in Perch Lake Township, Carlton County, Minnesota, United States. Its population was 443 as of the 2010 census.

Carlton County Road 25 (Mission Road) and County 7 (Cary Road) are two of the main routes in the community.  State Highway 210 (MN 210) and the community of Sawyer are both nearby.

Big Lake is located 10 miles west of Cloquet.

Education
It is divided between the Carlton School District and the Cloquet School District.

References

Census-designated places in Carlton County, Minnesota
Census-designated places in Minnesota